Richard Watson (1781–1833) was a British Methodist theologian, a leading figure of Wesleyan Methodism in the early 19th century.

Biography

Early life and education 
Watson was born on 22 February 1781, at Barton-upon-Humber, in Lincolnshire. He was the seventh of eighteen children of Thomas and Ann Watson. His father, a saddler, held Calvinist views, and Richard was brought up in the Countess of Huntingdon's Connexion. Reacting against those teachings, he attended a Wesleyan chapel as a boy, and was received there in 1794.

In 1791, Watson entered Lincoln Grammar School. In 1795 he was apprenticed to a joiner at Lincoln.

Career 
In 1796, Watson preached his first sermon, andemoved to Newark-on-Trent as assistant to Thomas Cooper, as a Wesleyan preacher. In 1796, he entered the Methodist itinerancy, and was received into full connection as a travelling minister in 1801. Meanwhile, he was stationed at Ashby-de-la-Zouch, Castle Donington, and Derby.

In 1801, Watson married Mary Henslow of Castle Donington, daughter of a Methodist New Connexion preacher there. They had two children. In 1803, he withdrew from the Wesleyans, and joined the New Connexion, resenting an unfounded charge of Arianism. In 1805, he became assistant secretary of the New Connexion's conference, and in 1807 he was fully admitted to its ministry and was appointed secretary. He was first stationed at Stockport, then from 1806 at Liverpool, where he engaged in literary work for Thomas Kaye.

In 1807, Watson resigned his ministry. In 1808 he was engaged as editor of the Liverpool Courier by Kaye. In 1812 he then returned to the Wesleyan Connexion, and was reinstated in his former position. In 1812, he was stationed at Wakefield, and at Hull from 1814 to 1816.

In 1813, Watson drew up a plan of a general missionary society, which was accepted by the conference. In 1810 he was removed to London, and made one of the two general secretaries to the Wesleyan Missionary Society from 1821 to 1827. After holding an appointment at Manchester, from 1827 to 29, he returned to London. He was again appointed a resident secretary to the missionary society from 1832 to 1833.

Death 
Watson died in London on 8 January 1833. He was buried in the graveyard behind City Road Chapel, London.

Theology 
Watson was a strong Methodist, but constantly wrote of the Anglican communion as "the mother of us all". He was deeply attached to the Anglican prayer-book, and was anxious to keep Methodism in friendly relations with the establishment.

Watson was a gifted writer and theologian. In doctrine, is known to be "an orthodox Trinitarian and an Evangelical Arminian".

In 1818 he wrote a reply to Adam Clarke's doctrine of the eternal Sonship of Christ; Watson believed that Clarke's views were unorthodox and, therefore, not faithfully Wesleyan.

From 1823 to 1829 he worked on his Theological Institutes, which remained a systematic theology standard for many years and deservedly ranks among the ablest expositions of the Arminian system. It was the first attempt to systematize John Wesley's theology and, by extension, Methodist doctrine.

His Biblical and Theological Dictionary (1831) is more comprehensive than previous attempts in English. In 1831, he wrote also a well-regarded Life of Rev. John Wesley.

In Britain, Watson was a leading opponent of slavery. He was not, however, for immediate emancipation.

Works

Notes and references

Citations

Sources

Further reading

External links

1781 births
1833 deaths
English Christian theologians
English abolitionists
English Methodists
English theologians
Methodist ministers
Methodist theologians
Arminian ministers
Arminian theologians
People from Lincolnshire
Presidents of the Methodist Conference
People educated at Lincoln Grammar School
19th-century Methodist ministers
Systematic theologians
Methodist abolitionists